is a railway station on the Chitose Line located in Chitose, Hokkaidō, Japan.

Railway stations in Hokkaido Prefecture
Railway stations in Japan opened in 1958
Chitose, Hokkaido